The Frederick Spangenberg House is a historic house in Saint Paul, Minnesota, United States.  It was built from 1864 to 1867 as the residence of a farm in what was then rural land outside the urban center.  The house was listed on the National Register of Historic Places in 1976 for having local significance in the theme of architecture.  Now enveloped by a 20th-century residential neighborhood, it was nominated for being one of the oldest limestone farmhouses preserved in Saint Paul.

History

Frederick Spangenberg was a German immigrant who built a prosperous dairy farm and milk-distribution business.  He also designed this house for himself and his wife Anna.  Its yellow limestone walls came from banks of the Mississippi River and hauled by stone-boat over snow to the building site.  When the house was under construction, the Spangenbergs lived in a log cabin on one end of the property, near where Jefferson and Cretin avenues intersect today. When completed in 1867, the house was surrounded by an  dairy farm, well outside the Saint Paul city limits.

Today the house is surrounded not by fields and barns but by the paved streets and ample houses of the Macalester–Groveland neighborhood. A one-story appendage originally served as a kitchen but was converted into a sitting room in 1932 by two of the Spangenberg sons, who lived in the house after their parents' deaths. The sons also transformed the first-floor bedroom into a kitchen, the parlor into a dining room, and one of the four upstairs bedrooms into a bathroom.

In 1954 the Spangenbergs' youngest granddaughter, Gertrude M. Yates, and her husband moved in and updated the interior while preserving its historic integrity. Then almost a century old, the house still contained a wine cellar complete with wooden casks and wine press, paddles and crocks for butter- and cheesemaking, and a cabbage cutter used for large-scale production of sauerkraut—a source of vitamins in the winter. The Yates family lived in the house until 1972, marking the end of the Spangenberg era. It was listed on the National Register of Historic Places in 1976.

See also
 National Register of Historic Places listings in Ramsey County, Minnesota

References

1864 establishments in Minnesota
Federal architecture in Minnesota
German-American culture in Minneapolis–Saint Paul
Houses completed in 1867
Houses in Saint Paul, Minnesota
Houses on the National Register of Historic Places in Minnesota
National Register of Historic Places in Saint Paul, Minnesota